The sixth season of the Romanian reality talent show Vocea României premiered on September 9, 2016 on ProTV.
Smiley, Loredana Groza, Tudor Chirilă and Marius Moga have all returned as judges, and Pavel Bartoș, as the presenter of the show. Lili Sandu replaced Oana Tache as the social media correspondent.

The season finale aired on December 16, 2016. Teams Smiley and Moga had one finalist each, while Team Tudor had two. Both semi-finalists in Team Loredana had been eliminated. Teodora Buciu mentored by Tudor Chirilă, was declared winner of the season. It was Chirilă's third consecutive victory as a coach.

Auditions

The open call auditions were held in the following locations:
Pre-selections took place in the following cities:

Teams
 Color key

Blind auditions
Color key

Episode 1 (September 9)
The coaches performed "A Kind of Magic" at the start of the show.

Episode 2 (September 11)
The second episode aired on September 11, 2016.

Episode 3 (September 16)
The third episode aired on September 16, 2016.

Episode 4 (September 23)
The fourth episode aired on September 23, 2016.

Episode 5 (September 30)
The fifth episode aired on September 30, 2016.

Episode 6 (October 7)
The sixth episode aired on October 7, 2016.

Episode 7 (October 14)
The seventh and last blind audition episode aired on October 14, 2016.

The Battles
After the Blind auditions, each coach had fourteen contestants for the Battle rounds. The Battles rounds started with episode 8 on October 21, 2016. Coaches began narrowing down the playing field by training the contestants. Each battle concluding with the respective coach eliminating one of the two contestants. Each coach could steal two losing contestant from another team, thus saving them from elimination.

Color key:

Episode 8 (21 October)
The eighth episode aired on October 21, 2016.

Episode 9 (28 October)
The ninth episode aired on October 28, 2016.

Episode 10 (4 November)
The tenth episode aired on November 4, 2016.

Episode 11 (11 November)
The eleventh episode aired on November 11, 2016.

Knockout rounds
The remaining nine artists from each team were split up into three groups of three. At the end of each knockout round the coach then decided out of the three artists who won, and therefore made up their three artists to take to the live shows.

Color key:

Episode 12 (18 November)
The twelfth episode aired on November 18, 2016.

Episode 13 (25 November)
The thirteenth episode aired on November 25, 2016.

Live shows
This year there will be three live shows.

Color key

Week 1 - Top 12 (2 December)
All 12 remaining contestants competed in the first live show on Friday, December 2, 2016. The public vote could save one contestant from each team, the second one being chosen by the coach. The other contestant was eliminated.

Week 2 - Semifinal (9 December )
The semi-final aired on Friday, December 9, 2016, and featured four "crossed duels" consisting of pairings of contestants from different teams. Each contestant performed a single song. The outcome of each duel was decided by public vote only. With the elimination of Ioncea and Roșcovan, for the second consecutive times, Loredana no longer had any artist remaining on her team.

Final (Week 3) 
The top 4 contestants performed in the grand final on Friday, December 16, 2016. This week, the four finalists performed a solo song, a duet with a special guest and a duet with their coach. The public vote determined the winner, and that resulted in a victory for Teodora Buciu, Tudor Chirilă's third consecutive victory as a coach.

Elimination chart 
Color key
Artist info

Result details

Overall

Ratings

References

2016 Romanian television seasons
Romania